Loukou may refer to:

Loukou, Burkina Faso
Loukou, Togo
Loukou Monastery, Greece